Ryan P. Klosterman (born May 28, 1982) is an American baseball coach and former shortstop. He is the head baseball coach at Bryant University. Klosterman played college baseball at Clemson University in 2001 and at Vanderbilt University from 2002 to 2004 for coach Tim Corbin and in Minor League Baseball (MiLB) for eight seasons from 2004 to 2011.

Klosterman was born in Eau Claire, Wisconsin. He attended South Lake High School in Groveland, Florida. After graduation from high school, he decided to attend Clemson University to play baseball. After his freshman year, he transferred to play college baseball at Vanderbilt University. After his junior season he was selected in the 5th round of the 2004 Major League Baseball draft by the Toronto Blue Jays.

In 2019, Klosterman was named the head coach of the Bryant Bulldogs baseball program, succeeding Steve Owens.

Playing career
Klosterman attended South Lake High School where he was a member of the school's baseball team. Upon graduation from high school, was intending to enroll at Lake–Sumter State College to play baseball, but when he played at an invitational at Clemson University, he was offered a position to continue his baseball career at Clemson. After using a redshirt as a sophomore at Clemson, Klosterman transferred to Vanderbilt University, following Tim Corbin, who had been an assistant at Clemson. Klosterman became the starting shortstop for the Commodores during the 2003 season. After the 2003 season, he played collegiate summer baseball for the Chatham A's of the Cape Cod Baseball League, and was named a league all-star. As a junior in 2004, Klosterman set the Commodores records for runs scored, and triples in a single season. He was named First Team All-Southeastern Conference following the season.

Coaching career
On July 29, 2019, Klosterman was named the head coach at Bryant University.

See also
 List of current NCAA Division I baseball coaches

References

External links

Bryant Bulldogs profile

1982 births
Living people
Baseball shortstops
Clemson Tigers baseball players
Vanderbilt Commodores baseball players
Chatham Anglers players
Auburn Doubledays players
Lansing Lugnuts players
Dunedin Blue Jays players
New Hampshire Fisher Cats players
Jacksonville Suns players
New Orleans Zephyrs players
Jupiter Hammerheads players
UCF Knights baseball coaches
Bryant Bulldogs baseball coaches
People from Eau Claire, Wisconsin
Baseball coaches from Wisconsin
Baseball players from Wisconsin